Anne King  may refer to:

Anne Blunt, 15th Baroness Wentworth, née Anne King-Noel
Anne King Gregorie

See also

Anna King (disambiguation)
King (surname)